Carlos Esteban Montero Fernández (born 20 March 1963 in Buenos Aires) is an Argentine journalist and news anchor. He worked at CNN en Español for 20 years until on 30 November 2017, he announced that his contract was not renewed. He was the anchor of Café CNN and La Noticia de la Semana.

Career

Carlos Montero is one of the most recognized and respected journalists in Latin America. With 30 years of experience in the US media and in his native country of Argentina, Carlos had the opportunity to cover the most important events of international interest both on the ground and from the studio. Among the special coverages are the death of Princess Diana, the war in Iraq, the capture of Saddam Hussein, the Arab Spring, the terrorist attacks of 9/11 (Montero was broadcasting live when the planes crashed into the Twin Towers), and several elections in the Americas, including Argentina, Paraguay, Nicaragua, Chile, Bolivia and the United States.
 
Montero was one of the original team of CNN en Español presenters where he worked for 21 years until opening his own production company "Montero Media". He was also the presenter of NBC Canal de Noticias and Channel 2 of Argentina. From 1989 to 1994 he was a reporter and producer of the news department of Univisión in Miami and a correspondent in the United States of Telefé Noticias from Argentina.

 Carlos began his career in the media at the young age of 15 as a production assistant in his father's production company, Montero Producciones. Born in Buenos Aires, Montero graduated in Mass Media Communications from Appalachian State University in Boone, North Carolina. He has received several awards for his journalistic work, including five Emmy awards, a Telly Award and a Conscience Award. Montero speaks Spanish and English.

Before joining CNN, Montero worked as host of Buenos Días América and América Noticias in América Televisión since 1994. He was also producer and reporter of the news department of the American Spanish-language network Univisión from 1992 to 1994 and correspondent of the Argentine channel Telefé. In 1996 he joined de defunct channel NBC Canal de Noticias.

Montero is one of the members of the original staff of CNN en Español in its inception in 1997. He anchored the defunct morning news program Al Día and since 2011 is anchoring Café CNN and regular analyst in CNN International.

As of December 1, 2017 Carlos Montero is no longer part of CNN as he has not renew his contract. After opening his production company in 2018, he joins Appalachian State University as Practitioner in Residence of the award winner AppTv. He teaches Broadcast Performance techniques and Tv news and sport reporting.

Events covered
 The 1993 World Trade Center bombing.
 The peace treaty between Israel and Palestine.
 The 1993 Guatemalan constitutional crisis.
 The Lewinsky scandal and subsequent Impeachment of Bill Clinton.
 The 1996 Republican National Convention.
 The death and funeral of Diana, Princess of Wales.
 Several elections in the United States.
 The Iraq War
 The 2004 Madrid train bombings

Interviewed
 Carlos Menem
 Andrés Pastrana
 Vicente Fox
 Al Gore
 Colin Powell
 Rigoberta Menchú
 Adolfo Pérez Esquivel
 Fernando Lugo

References

https://communication.appstate.edu/faculty-staff/directory/carlos-montero 
https://www.cnn.com/CNN/anchors_reporters/montero.carlos.html
https://www.mediamoves.com/2020/05/montero-tapped-as-u-s-correspondent-for-c5n.html
https://www.linkedin.com/in/carlos-montero-922b991
https://www.eluniverso.com/entretenimiento/2017/11/29/nota/6504835/carlos-montero-trabajara-hasta-manana-cnn-espanol/
https://fmmundo.com/derechos-reservados-un-programa-periodistico-con-carlos-montero/

1963 births
Living people
People from Buenos Aires
CNN people
Argentine television journalists